The Sungai Petani railway station is a Malaysian train station located at and named after the city of Sungai Petani. The station is on Keretapi Tanah Melayu's West Coast Line and is served by the KTM ETS and the KTM Komuter Northern Sector services. It was also previously served by the International Express.

The station was rebuilt under the Ipoh-Padang Besar Electrification and Double-Tracking Project (EDTP) and became operational on 10 June 2014.

On 11 September 2015, Keretapi Tanah Melayu Berhad introduced the Northern Sector KTM Komuter Shuttle (Tren Shuttle KTM Komuter Sektor Utara in Bahasa Malaysia) service between Gurun in Kedah, Butterworth in Pulau Pinang and Kamunting in Perak. This followed the completion of the Ipoh-Padang Besar Electrification and Double-Tracking Project in December 2014. This has since been expanded into the Padang Besar-Butterworth route of the KTM Komuter Northern Sector line.

External links
Sungai Petani Railway Station at www.keretapi.com
Kuala Lumpur MRT & KTM Intercity Integrations

Kuala Muda District
KTM ETS railway stations
Railway stations opened in 1915
Railway stations in Kedah